Thaveesha Kahaduwaarachchi (born 28 October 2000) is a Sri Lankan cricketer. He made his List A debut on 19 December 2019, for Saracens Sports Club in the 2019–20 Invitation Limited Over Tournament. In January 2020, he was named in Sri Lanka's squad for the 2020 Under-19 Cricket World Cup. He made his Twenty20 debut on 6 March 2021, for Saracens Sports Club in the 2020–21 SLC Twenty20 Tournament.

References

External links
 

2000 births
Living people
Sri Lankan cricketers
Saracens Sports Club cricketers
Place of birth missing (living people)